D is a musical note a whole tone above C, and is known as Re within the fixed-Do solfege system. Its enharmonic equivalents are C (C-double sharp) and E (E-double flat). It is the third semitone of the solfège.

When calculated in equal temperament with a reference of A above middle C as 440 Hz, the frequency of middle D (D4) is approximately 293.665 Hz. See pitch for a discussion of historical variations in frequency.

Designation by octave

Scales

Common scales beginning on D
 D major: D E F G A B C D
 D harmonic major: D E F G A B C D
 D melodic major ascending: D E F G A B C D
 D melodic major descending: D C B A G F E D
 D natural minor: D E F G A B C D
 D harmonic minor: D E F G A B C D
 D melodic minor ascending: D E F G A B C D
 D melodic minor descending: D C B A G F E D

Diatonic scales
 D Ionian: D E F G A B C D
 D Dorian: D E F G A B C D
 D Phrygian: D E F G A B C D
 D Lydian: D E F G A B C D
 D Mixolydian: D E F G A B C D
 D Aeolian: D E F G A B C D
 D Locrian: D E F G A B C D

Jazz melodic minor
 D ascending melodic minor: D E F G A B C D
 D Dorian ♭2: D E F G A B C D
 D Lydian augmented: D E F G A B C D
 D Lydian dominant: D E F G A B C D
 D Mixolydian ♭6: D E F G A B C D
 D Locrian ♮2: D E F G A B C D
 D altered: D E F G A B C D

See also
 Piano key frequencies
 D major
 D minor
 Root (chord)

References

Musical notes